On 3 November 2021, a 40-seater bus heading to Rawalpindi carrying more than 30 passengers fell into a ditch in Pallandri, Sudhanoti District, Azad Jammu and Kashmir killed at least 23 people, including women and children and seven others were injured.

The bus had started its journey from Tehsil Headquarters Baloch and after a difficult 7 km journey, the vehicle had a technical problem. The bus first collided with a mountain on the left side of the road and then suddenly turned and fell into a ditch more than 500 meters deep. A man selling pakoras near the scene, saw the bus fall and by phone alerted the religious leader of the Majhiari village about 2 km from Baloch. They announced this to the speaker, the religious leader called on the locals to launch a rescue operation to help the victims.

Five injured were shifted to Kotli district while three others have been shifted to Baloch Health Center. One of the injured succumbed to his injuries. On the occasion, PML-N leader and former Azad Jammu and Kashmir Minister Sardar Farooq Ahmed Tahir also reached the spot along with rescue teams. Accidents are common in the area, especially in rural areas, where roads are dilapidated.

In October, 32 passengers, including four students, were injured in two accidents in Poonch and Neelum districts, while the third accident in Muzaffarabad injured 10 people.

The Prime Minister of Azad Kashmir, Sardar Abdul Qayyum Khan Niazi and PML-N President and Leader of the Opposition Shahbaz Sharif expressed deep sorrow and grief over the loss of lives in the tragic accident and prayed for the speedy recovery of the injured. Sardar Abdul Qayyum Khan Niazi directed the administration to expedite the relief operations.

References 

2021 in Pakistan
Bus incidents in Pakistan
Azad Kashmir
Road incident deaths in Pakistan
Sudhanoti District